Hebron Brick is a brick manufacturing company located in Hebron, North Dakota.  It is also the only brick company in North Dakota. Charles Weigel and Ferdinand Leutz established Hebron Fire & Pressed Brick Company in 1904. Demand for building supplies was flourishing, and by 1905 Hebron Brick hit full production, competing with 18 similar brick businesses.

External links
Hebron Brick

Manufacturing companies established in 1904
Companies based in North Dakota
Brick manufacturers
Building materials companies of the United States